James Patrick Walsh (August 29, 1930 – March 4, 1976) was an American basketball player.

A 6'4" forward from Stanford University, Walsh competed at the 1956 Summer Olympics, where he won a gold medal with the United States national basketball team.  He then played one season (1957–1958) in the National Basketball Association as a member of the Philadelphia Warriors, averaging 2.0 points per game.

External links

Olympic Medal Record at DatabaseOlympics.com

1930 births
1976 deaths
Baltimore Bullets (1944–1954) draft picks
Basketball players at the 1956 Summer Olympics
Basketball players from San Francisco
Medalists at the 1956 Summer Olympics
Olympic gold medalists for the United States in basketball
Philadelphia Warriors players
Phillips 66ers players
Small forwards
Stanford Cardinal men's basketball players
United States men's national basketball team players
American men's basketball players